Foroyaa is a newspaper located in Serrekunda, the Gambia. It was first launched in July 1987, and is owned by the People's Democratic Organisation for Independence and Socialism (PDOIS), an opposition political party that was instrumental in bringing the downfall of ex-president Yahya Jammeh in the 1 December 2016 election.

References

External links
 Homepage

English-language newspapers published in Africa
Newspapers published in the Gambia
Newspapers established in 1987
Serekunda